The 2008 Letran Knights men's basketball team represented Colegio de San Juan de Letran in the 84th season of the National Collegiate Athletic Association in the Philippines. The men's basketball tournament for the school year 2008-09 began on June 28, 2008, and the host school for the season was Mapúa Institute of Technology.

The Knights, after finishing the double round-robin eliminations with 9 wins against 5 losses, underwent a series of classification matches before landing at third place. In a tight race for the Final Four, four teams including the Knights, were tied from 2nd to 5th place. Letran beat the hosts Mapúa in the classification round, advancing in the second-seed playoff and a virtual best-of-three series against JRU. In the next round, the Heavy Bombers manhandled the Knights 69–53. In the Final Four, the Knights were eliminated by JRU in one game. Letran star shooting guard RJ Jazul was named one of the Mythical Five members.

Roster 

 Depth chart Depth chart

NCAA Season 84 games results 

Elimination games were played in a double round-robin format. All games were aired on Studio 23.

Source: Ubelt.com

Awards

References 

Letran Knights basketball team seasons